The 1909 Yale Bulldogs football team was an American football team that represented Yale University as an independent during the 1909 college football season. The team finished with a 10–0 record, shut out every opponent, and outscored them by a total of 209 to 0. Howard Jones was the team's head coach, and Ted Coy was the team captain.

There was no contemporaneous system in 1909 for determining a national champion. However, Yale was retroactively named as the national champion by the Billingsley Report, Helms Athletic Foundation, Houlgate System, National Championship Foundation, and Parke H. Davis.

Six Yale players were selected as consensus first-team players on the 1909 All-America team. The team's consensus All-Americans were: fullback Ted Coy; halfback Stephen Philbin; end John Kilpatrick; center Carroll Cooney; guard Hamlin Andrus; and tackle Henry Hobbs.

Schedule

References

Yale
Yale Bulldogs football seasons
College football national champions
College football undefeated seasons
Yale Bulldogs football